Annette Roque (born December 1966) is a model and equestrian. Her mother is Dutch and her father is Indonesian.

As a model in the 1980s and 1990s, Roque was known professionally as "Jade Roque." She appeared widely in European cosmetics ads, and in the J. Crew and Victoria's Secret catalogs in the United States. Roque was a Revlon "spokesmodel".

Roque co-owns and manages Bright Side Farm, a horse farm in the Hamptons completed in 2013.

Personal life

Roque was married to American television journalist Matt Lauer, whom she met on a blind date in July 1997. Lauer proposed to Roque after five months of dating and the two wed in Water Mill, New York, on October 3, 1998. They have three children together, son Jack (b. June 26, 2001), daughter Romy (b. October 2, 2003), and son Thijs (b. November 28, 2006).

In September 2006, while pregnant with Thijs, Roque filed for divorce, citing cruel and inhumane treatment from Lauer, but she and Lauer later reconciled. However, in 2018, she filed for divorce a second time following a series of sexual assault allegations against Lauer by multiple victims.

References

External links
 Who is Annette Roque?
 8 Things to Know About Matt Lauer's Wife, Annette Roque
 Bright Side Farm

Dutch female models
American female models
Place of birth missing (living people)
1966 births
American female equestrians
Living people
Dutch people of Indonesian descent
Dutch emigrants to the United States
American people of Dutch-Indonesian descent
21st-century American women